The Union Concert Hall is in the East wing of the part of Beit Quadrangle of Imperial College, London, occupied by Imperial College Union. The room is part of the theatre installed within the building.  It is home to Imperial College Union Cinema and the Imperial College Dramatic Society, and is a multi-purpose space used by clubs, societies and projects of Imperial College Union.  It can also be hired by outside customers.

Venue facilities
The theatre has a number of facilities available to users including installation throughout of Ethernet and DMX, a Service Loop and a large scaffold tower. The stage is raised from the floor level of the hall, and extends up two storeys, including a fly gallery with many fly-bars and electrically operated lighting bars.

Additionally, a large amount of equipment is owned and hired out by the Imperial College Dramatic Society which is available to people who book the hall.

The Hall also contains a large cinema screen which can be raised and lowered for the purpose of screening films. This is used by Imperial Cinema.

References

External links
Imperial College Union Cinema
Club, Society & Project A to Z
Imperial College Dramatic Society (DramSoc)
Concert Hall page at Beit Conferences, a commercial arm of Imperial College Union

Buildings and structures of Imperial College London